Francine Mary Panehal (October 10, 1925 – March 1, 2002) was a member of the Ohio House of Representatives. She served as state house majority whip from 1979 until 1981.

References

 Kelly, James (September 28, 1981). "Those Cuts: How Deep is Deep?". Time.
Wikle, Gretel (November 15, 1985). "Ok DayCare Bill". UPI. The Bryan Times.
"Combat Pay: U.S. A Nation of Dictators". The Spartanburg Herald. February 9, 1976. page A4.

Democratic Party members of the Ohio House of Representatives
Women state legislators in Ohio
Politicians from Cleveland
1925 births
2002 deaths
20th-century American politicians
20th-century American women politicians